McKellar is a surname. Notable people with the surname include:

 Archibald McKellar (1816–1894), Canadian politician
 Archie McKellar (1912–1940), Royal Air Force fighter pilot during the Battle of Britain
 Colin McKellar (1903–1970), Australian farmer, soldier and federal politician
 Danica McKellar (born 1975), American actress, sister of Crystal
 Daniel McKellar (1892–1917), Scottish footballer
 Don McKellar (born 1963), Canadian actor, writer, and filmmaker
Honor McKellar (born 1920), former New Zealand mezzo-soprano opera singer and singing teacher
 John McKellar (1833–1900), Canadian businessman and politician
 John McKellar (writer) (1930–2010), Australian playwright, social satirist
 Kenneth McKellar (politician) (1869–1957), American politician
 Kenneth McKellar (singer) (1927–2010), Scottish singer
 Earl McKellar (1918–1976), Canadian politician
 Phil McKellar, Australian record producer

See also
 Kellar
Mackellar (disambiguation)
John Thompson McKellar Anderson